e-Choupal is an initiative of ITC Limited, a unique web-based page, to link directly with rural farmers via the Internet for procurement of agricultural and aquaculture products like soybeans, wheat, coffee, and prawns. e-Choupal tackles the challenges posed by Indian agriculture, characterized by fragmented farms, weak infrastructure and the involvement of intermediaries. The programme installs computers with Internet access in rural areas of India to offer farmers up-to-date marketing and agricultural information.

Benefits of e-Choupal
ITC Limited has provided computers and Internet access in rural areas across several agricultural regions of the country, where the farmers can directly negotiate the sale of their products with ITC Limited. Online access enables farmers to obtain information on mandi prices, and good farming practices, and to place orders for agricultural inputs like seeds and fertilizers. This helps farmers improve the quality of their products, and helps in obtaining a better price

ITC Limited kiosk with Internet access is run by a sanchalak — a trained farmer. The computer is housed in the sanchalak's house and is linked to the Internet via phone lines or by a VSAT connection. Each installation serves an average of 600 farmers in the surrounding ten villages within about a 5 km radius. The sanchalak bears some operating cost but in return earns a service fee for the e-transactions done through his e-Choupal. The warehouse hub is managed by the same traditional middlemen, now called samyojaks, but with no exploitative power due to the reorganization. These middlemen make up for the lack of infrastructure and fulfill critical jobs like cash disbursement, quantity aggregation, and transportation.

Since the introduction of e-Choupal services, farmers have seen a rise in their income levels because of a rise in yields, improvement in quality of output, and a fall in transaction costs. Even small farmers have gained from the initiative. Farmers can get real-time information despite their physical distance from the mandis. The system saves procurement costs for ITC Limited. The farmers do not pay for the information and knowledge they get from e-Choupals; the principle is to inform, empower and compete. e-marketplace for spot transactions and support services to future's exchange

There are 6,100 e-Choupals in operation in 35,000 villages in 10 states (Madhya Pradesh, Haryana, Uttarakhand, Uttar Pradesh, Rajasthan, Karnataka, Kerala, Maharashtra, Andhra Pradesh and Tamil Nadu), affecting around 4 million farmers.

In 2020, ITC rolled out e-Choupal 4.0, that provides farmers with information on weather and markets on a real-time basis. It also advises farmers on crop monitoring and electronic marketing place.

References

Notes
 Bhatia, Tej K. 2007. Advertising and marketing in rural India. Delhi: Macmillan India
 Chapter 11 of this book deals with the economic and developmental impact of e-Choupal.
 Goyal, Aparajita. 2010. Information, Direct Access to Farmers, and Rural Market Performance in Central India. American Economic Journal: Applied Economics, Vol. 2, No. 3, pages 22–45.

External links
e-Choupal on ITC Portal
e-Choupal Case by ACRC
Information, Direct Access to Farmers, and Rural Market Performance in Central India by Aparajita Goyal, World Bank, July 2010

Agricultural marketing in India
E-commerce in India
ITC Limited